William Mitchell (March 14, 1851 – May 10, 1926) was a Canadian politician.

Born in Durham Township, Canada West, the son of Thomas Mitchell and Margaret Patrick, both from the north of Ireland, Mitchell started working for a railway company in Maine. He moved back to Durham where he worked in the lumber business. He later moved to Drummondville, Quebec, where he also worked in the lumber business. He was appointed to the Senate of Canada in 1904 by Wilfrid Laurier. He sat as a Liberal and served until his death in 1926.

His son, Walter George Mitchell, was also a politician.

References

1851 births
1926 deaths
Canadian senators from Quebec
Liberal Party of Canada senators
Anglophone Quebec people
Canadian people of Irish descent